The Australian Information Security Association (AISA) is an Australian-based professional membership association, not-for-profit and peak industry body that seeks to facilitate the development of a robust information security sector by building the capacity of professionals in Australia and advancing the cyber security and safety of the Australian public as well as businesses and governments in Australia. Established in 1999, AISA has a membership of over 7,000 individuals. AISA seeks caters to all domains of the information security industry with a particular focus on sharing expertise from the field at meetings, focus groups and networking opportunities around Australia.

Vision
AISA works towards a vision where people, businesses and governments are educated about the risks and dangers of cyber attack and data theft, and to enable them to take all reasonable precautions to protect themselves.

AISA has branches in all Australian states and territories, including in Sydney, Melbourne, Canberra, Brisbane, Perth, Adelaide, Darwin and Hobart. AISA also hosts a 'cloud' branch that caters for individuals who are unable to attend in-person branch events. Meetings occur in each state every month and attract information security professionals, IT professionals, professionals from privacy, law and risk management, as well as enthusiasts and students from a wide cross-section of organisations.

AISA is an organisation for individuals rather than companies and aims to maintain an unbiased view of information security in Australia.

AISA hosts two major conferences annually, The Australian Cyber Conference. Conferences are hosted in Canberra every year, with a second annual conference alternating between Sydney and Melbourne. In addition, smaller conferences take place in Perth, Brisbane and Adelaide.

AISA works closely with international cybersecurity and auditing organisations such as (ISC)², ISACA, and IAPP.

References

External links
Official Website
Cyber ​​Insurance
Cyber Security

Computer security organizations
Professional associations based in Australia